Carolyn Hill (born February 1, 1959) is an American professional golfer who played on the LPGA Tour.

Career
Hill won the 1979 U.S. Women's Amateur and played on the 1978 U.S. Curtis Cup team.

Hill won once on the LPGA Tour in 1994. Hill's win came in her 359th start, the tour record for most starts before a first win. A 1996 car accident slowed her touring career and she became a club professional in California.

Professional wins

LPGA Tour wins (1)

Team appearances
Amateur
Curtis Cup (representing the United States): 1978 (winners)

References

External links

American female golfers
Miami Hurricanes women's golfers
Tulsa Golden Hurricane women's golfers
LPGA Tour golfers
Winners of ladies' major amateur golf championships
Golfers from Santa Monica, California
Golfers from Florida
Sportspeople from St. Petersburg, Florida
1959 births
Living people